Kaestlea travancorica, also known as the Travancore ground skink or Barbour's ground skink, is a species of skink endemic to southern Western Ghats.

Description
A medium-sized (3.8 cm), blue-tailed forest skink. Earlier placed in the genus Scincella, it is now included in the genus Kaestlea. It is diurnal and known to feed on insects on the forest floor.

Distribution
Restricted to the Western Ghats, India. Mainly known from Travancore regions of Tamil Nadu and Kerala states.

References

Notes
  Ouboter, P.E. 1986 A revision of the genus Scincella (Reptilia: Sauria: Scincidae) of Asia, with some notes on its evolution. Zoologische Verhandelingen (Leiden) (No. 229) 1986: 1-66 PDF
 Smith,M.A. 1937 A review of the genus Lygosoma (Scincida Reptilia) and its allies. Rec. Ind. Mus. 39 (3): 213-234

External links

Kaestlea
Reptiles of India
Endemic fauna of the Western Ghats
Taxa named by Richard Henry Beddome
Reptiles described in 1870